Garrie David Gibson (born 17 October 1954) is an Australian retired politician and ex CEO of RSL clubs Australia. Born in Brisbane, he was educated at the University of Queensland and the North Brisbane College of Advanced Education before becoming a primary teacher. He was an organiser with the Queensland Teachers Union before his election to the Australian House of Representatives in 1990 as the Labor member for Moreton. His election was the first time the Labor Party had ever won the seat, which has existed since Federation, although independent James Wilkinson sat as a Labor member from 1904–1906. Gibson held the seat until his defeat in 1996.

References

Australian Labor Party members of the Parliament of Australia
Members of the Australian House of Representatives for Moreton
Members of the Australian House of Representatives
1954 births
Living people
20th-century Australian politicians